The California Historical Radio Society ("CHRS') is a non-profit organization centered on the history of radio and radio broadcasting, including related technologies such as vintage TV, amateur radio and HiFi. The focus is on the history of early radio and early radio broadcasting in California, especially the San Francisco Bay Area and the western states.  Its museum and headquarters, known as "Radio Central," are located on its new site in Alameda, California.

History

Norman Berge, Jim Cirner, Attorney Gene Rippen and several others founded the California Historical Radio Society as a non-profit corporation in 1974 and qualified it as an IRC 501(c)(3) tax-exempt organization. CHRS absorbed the web-only "Bay Area Radio Museum" founded by David F. Jackson in 2003 in Berkeley, California. CHRS then absorbed the Society of Wireless Pioneers (then managed by Waldo Boyd) by merger in 2012 and took custody of its archives and re-established its website, on which it publishes archival materials and commentary.  CHRS took custody of the James Maxwell radio archives and library, and succeeded to his amateur radio callsign, W6CF for its amateur radio operations. In 2014, CHRS moved to Alameda. from its earlier temporary home at the historic Berkeley radio station KRE.

The CHRS annually hosts its "Radio Day by the Bay" fundraiser each summer, where old-time radio shows are performed, Each fall, CHRS inducts notable local broadcasters into its Bay Area Radio Hall of Fame. CHRS continues to host the Bay Area Radio Museum, an online collection of airchecks.

On its primary websites, CHRS publishes texts, video and audio about radio history, radio restorations and news of its current activities including amateur radio. The Society of Wireless Pioneers (SoWP) covers the men (and some women) of early wireless telegraphy especially sea-going radio operators as well as their many evolving technologies. The Bay Area Radio Museum and Hall of Fame primarily honors radio industry people and archives broadcasts.

The CHRS Journal is widely admired in radio history circles and played a part in the recognition of CHRS by the Antique Wireless Association (AWA) in New York, which bestowed its annual Houck Award (2015) and its Taylor Television Award (2020) on CHRS. AWA has also bestowed the Houck Award on two CHRS historians Mike Adams (1995) and Bart Lee (2003), the (inaugural) Murray Award for the best article in the AWA Review on Bart Lee (2018), and in 2020 made Adams and Lee (inaugural) AWA Fellows.

Current activities in the museum include an evolving television history display managed by physicist Dr. John W. Staples. The W6CF amateur radio station operates both modern and vintage ham radio gear in its own "radio shack." CHRS, by its dedicated corps of volunteers, is presently (2021) completing the new Radio Hall of Fame center and a replica but working radio studio, and configuring its Great Hall for displays and expositions.

References

External links
 California Historical Radio Society
 Society of Wireless Pioneers
Facebook
 YouTube
 Bay Area Radio Museum and Hall of Fame

2014 establishments in California
Buildings and structures in Alameda, California
History museums in California
Museums in Alameda County, California
Museums established in 2014